Edward Bayntun (c.1520 – 1593), of Bromham and Rowden, Wiltshire, was an English politician.

He was sheriff of Wiltshire in 1571, a Member (MP) of the Parliament of England for Wiltshire in 1563, Devizes in 1571 and Calne in 1572.

References

1520 births
1593 deaths
People from Wiltshire
English MPs 1563–1567
English MPs 1571
English MPs 1572–1583